Giant Robot may refer to:

 Giant Robot (magazine), magazine of Asian American popular culture
 Mecha, a piloted or remote-controlled limbed vehicle
 Giant Robot Week, week-long event that aired on Cartoon Network's Toonami in 2003

Music 
 Giant Robot (Buckethead album), 1994 solo album by Buckethead
 Giant Robot, 1996 album by  Buckethead with the band Giant Robot

See also
 Giant Robo, a tokusatsu, anime and manga series
 Robot (disambiguation)